Michelle Cook (born January 19, 1970) is an American politician who has served in the Connecticut House of Representatives from the 65th district since 2009.

References

1970 births
Living people
Democratic Party members of the Connecticut House of Representatives
21st-century American politicians